The following is a timeline of the history of the city of Belém, in the state of Pará, Brazil.

Prior to 20th century

 1616 - Forte do Presépio de Belém (fort) established by Portuguese.
 1625 - Casa de Haver o Peso (tax office) in operation.
 1719 - Church and Former College of Saint Alexander built.
 1720 - Roman Catholic diocese of Belém do Pará established.
 1753 - Comissão de Limites (boundary commission) and military arrive.
 1763 -  (church) built.
 1769 -  (hospital) opens.
 1771 - Palácio de Governo built.
 1777 -  (church) consecrated.
 1782
  (church) built.
 Construction of Our Lady of Grace Cathedral completed.
 1822 -  newspaper begins publication.
 1827 - A Voz das Amazonas newspaper begins publication.
 1829 - O Sagitário newspaper begins publication.
 1835 - Cabanagem separatist revolt begins.
 1841 -  (school) founded.
 1866 - Museu Paraense (museum) founded.
 1867 - Mercado Municipal de Carnes (market) built.
 1868 - Palácio da Câmara Municipal e Prefeitura built.
 1872
 Instituto Paraense de Educandos Artífices established.
 Population: 61,997.
 1874 - Theatro da Paz (theatre) opens.
 1876 -  newspaper begins publication.
 1879 - Amazon rubber boom begins.
 1883 -  built.
 1891 -  becomes mayor.
 1896 - Folha do Norte begins publication.
 1900
 Population: 96,560.

20th century
 1901 - Mercado Ver-o-Peso (market) opens.
 1909 - Basilica of Our Lady of Nazareth of Exile construction begins.
 1911 -  (market) built.
 1912 -  (cinema) opens.
 1914 - Paysandu Sport Club founded.
 1915 - Bolonha Mansion completed by Francisco Bolonha.
 1918 - Estádio da Curuzú (stadium) opens.
 1920 - Population: 236,402.
 1946 -  newspaper begins publication.
 1957 - Federal University of Pará established.
 1960 - Population: 402,170.
 1970 - Population: 642,514.
 1976 -  begins broadcasting.
 1978 - Mangueirão (stadium) opens.
 1980 - Population: 949,545.
 1982 -  newspaper begins publication.
 1991 - Population: 1,244,688.
 1994 - Belém do Pará Convention (official name: Inter-American Convention on the Prevention, Punishment and Eradication of Violence Against Women), the first legally binding international treaty that criminalises all forms of violence against women, especially sexual violence.
 1994 - Campeonato Internacional de Tênis do Estado do Pará (tennis tournament) begins.
 1996 -  held.

21st century
 2002 - August: Part of 2002 South American Games held in city.
 2010 - Village Moon and Village Sun skyscrapers built.
 2013 -  becomes mayor.
 2016
  (bus) begins operating.
 October:  held.
 Population: 1,446,042.

See also
 Belém history
 
 List of mayors of Belém

References

This article incorporates information from the Portuguese Wikipedia and German Wikipedia.

Bibliography

in English
  

in Portuguese

External links

Belém
Belém
Years in Brazil
belem